Freddie "Fred" McMullan (born 4 June 1950) is a Northern Irish former professional darts player who competed in the 1980s.

Career
McMullan played at the World Darts Championship three times. In 1985, he beat Peter Locke of Wales in the first round and then beat Bobby George to reach the quarter-finals but was defeated by Cliff Lazarenko. In 1985 MFI World Matchplay he lose Terry O'Dea from Australia. In 1986 he beat Willie Mands in the first round but lost in round two to John Lowe. In 1986 MFI World Pairs defeated Keith Deller and Bobby George in the semi-finals with Dave Whitcombe and lose to Eric Bristow and Peter Locke. He returned in 1988 and defeated Finland's Tapani Uitos in round one but lost in the second round to Peter Evison from England.

Before all this, McMullan reached the semi-finals of the 1984 Winmau World Masters, beating Angel Ruiz, Christer Pilbald, Ellis Elsevif, Peter Locke, Nicky Skinner Jocky Wilson and Alan Evans before losing to reigning champion Eric Bristow who eventually retained his title.

He retired in 1999 due to health problems.

World Championship Results

BDO
 1985: Quarter Final: (lost to Cliff Lazarenko 0–4) (sets)
 1986: Last 16: (lost to John Lowe 1–3)
 1988: Last 16: (lost to Peter Evison 0–3)

References

Living people
Darts players from Northern Ireland
British Darts Organisation players
1950 births